Simon Gutierrez is an American runner.

At the 1989 IAAF World Cross Country Championships he finished 83rd in the senior men's race.

He is a multiple-time winner of the Mount Washington Road Race.

Gutierrez was the 2005 U.S. Mountain Runner of the Year.

He was the initial inspiration for Joseph Gray.

He is a member of the Colorado Running Hall of Fame.

References

Living people
American male long-distance runners
American male ultramarathon runners
1966 births
20th-century American people